East or Southeast Plateau are a "probable" group of three Plateau languages spoken in Nigeria. Fyam and Horom are closely related; connections to Barkul (Bo-Rukul) are more problematic.

Names and locations
Below is a list of language names, populations, and locations from Blench (2019).

Footnotes

References
Blench (2008) Prospecting proto-Plateau. Manuscript.

External links
Roger Blench: Southeast Plateau page

 
Plateau languages